Joseph May is a British-born Canadian actor, who has appeared in television and film. He is best known for his role as Andy Button in the television series Episodes, Paul who was the boyfriend of Sam Colloby, in Casualty, Luke in I Live with Models and for voicing Thomas the Tank Engine in the US dub of the children's television series Thomas & Friends from 2015 to 2021.

His other television roles include Adam Moseby in Bugs, Dan Sanders in Hollyoaks, Sgt. Markham in Stargate: Atlantis and Justin Trudeau in The Windsors.

His voice work in animation and video games include Link in G.I. Joe: Valor vs. Venom, Mr. Wexler in The Barbie Diaries, Autolycus in Class of the Titans, Michael Corleone in The Godfather, Perdido in Xenoblade Chronicles 2, Chase McCain in Lego City Undercover, Jost and Saravad in Horizon Zero Dawn, Hiro in The Crew 2 and Ellis in Blair Witch.

Early life
Born in England and raised in Calgary, Alberta, Canada, May returned to the UK to study at the London Academy of Music and Dramatic Art.

Career
May may be most recognised by British-American television viewers as Paul, the unemployed partner of gay nurse Sam Colloby in Casualty's 12th season. He also starred in the final season of the sci-fi series Bugs as the naive and misguided Adam Mosby. May has also appeared in the television series Stargate: Atlantis as Sgt. Markham of the United States Marine Corps, Episodes as Andy Button, a television casting director, and as Larry Schwarz in the BBC television movie We'll Take Manhattan.

May's initiation into film was as a miner in the Brian Gilbert 1997 Oscar Wilde biopic, Wilde. Since then, he has appeared in the critically acclaimed World War II miniseries Band of Brothers as second lieutenant Edward Shames, 2001's Investigating Sex as Roger, Resident Evil as Dr. Blue and Holby City as surgeon George Kerwan in 2010.

May voiced the character of main protagonist Chase McCain for the 2013 video game Lego City Undercover and its prequel, Lego City Undercover: The Chase Begins.

In 2015, he joined the US voice cast of Thomas & Friends as Thomas the Tank Engine (following Martin Sherman's departure from the title role after the eighteenth series), starting with the special The Adventure Begins. In 2021, May left the show due to Thomas & Friends airing a reboot titled All Engines: Go! for the twenty-fifth series. May voiced the character of the mercenary Phantom in the team-based first-person shooter Dirty Bomb.

In 2019, he went to play Brett Huntley in the television miniseries Dark Mon£y, which featured Babou Ceesay and John Schwab.

Filmography

Film

Television

Video games

References

External links

Living people
Alumni of the London Academy of Music and Dramatic Art
British male film actors
British male television actors
British male video game actors
British male voice actors
British emigrants to Canada
Canadian male film actors
Canadian male television actors
Canadian male video game actors
Canadian male voice actors
Male actors from Calgary
Canadian people of English descent
20th-century British male actors
20th-century Canadian male actors
21st-century British male actors
21st-century Canadian male actors
Year of birth missing (living people)